The 2014 Canadian Direct Insurance BC Men's Curling Championship, the provincial men's curling championship for British Columbia, was held from February 4 to 9 at the Vancouver Curling Club in Vancouver, British Columbia. The winning team of John Morris represented the home province of British Columbia at the 2014 Tim Hortons Brier in Kamloops.

Qualification process
Sixteen teams will qualify for the provincial tournament through several methods. The qualification process is as follows:

Teams
The teams are listed as follows:

Knockout Draw Brackets
The draw is listed as follows:

A Event

B Event

C Event

Playoffs

A vs. B
Saturday, February 8, 11:00 am

C1 vs. C2
Saturday, February 8, 11:00 am

Semifinal
Saturday, February 8, 7:00 pm

Final
Sunday, February 9, 4:00 pm

References

External links

Curling in British Columbia
Canadian Direct Insurance BC Men's Curling Championship
Sport in Vancouver
Canadian Direct Insurance BC Men's Curling Championship